The first D'Alema government was the government of Italy from 21 October 1998 to 22 December 1999.

The first Prodi government fell in 1998 when the Communist Refoundation Party withdrew its support to Prodi. This led to the formation of a new government led by Massimo D'Alema as Prime Minister. There are those who claim that D'Alema deliberately engineered the collapse of the Prodi government to become Prime Minister himself. As the result of a vote of no confidence in Prodi's government, D'Alema's nomination was passed by a single vote. This was the first and so far, the only occasion in the history of the Italian republic on which a vote of no confidence had ever been called; the Republic's many previous governments had been brought down by a majority "no" vote on some crucially important piece of legislation (such as the budget).

Party breakdown

Ministers

Ministers and other members
 Democrats of the Left (DS): Prime minister, 7 ministers and 22 undersecretaries
 Italian People’s Party (PPI): Deputy Prime minister, 5 ministers and 11 undersecretaries
 Democratic Union for the Republic (UDR): 3 ministers and 8 undersecretaries
 Independents: 3 ministers and 5 undersecretaries
 Italian Renewal (RI): 2 ministers and 5 undersecretaries
 Party of Italian Communists (PdCI): 2 ministers and 3 undersecretaries
 Federation of the Greens (FdV): 2 ministers and 3 undersecretaries
 Italian Democratic Socialists (SDI): 1 minister and 2 undersecretaries

Composition

References

Italian governments
1998 establishments in Italy
1999 disestablishments in Italy
Cabinets established in 1998
Cabinets disestablished in 1999